Saint Patrick is one of Dominica's 10 administrative parishes. It is bordered by St. George, St. Luke and St. Mark to the west, and St. David to the north. It has an area of 84.4 km² (32.59 mi²), and has a population of 8,383.

Grand Bay (also known as Berekua) and La Plaine are the largest settlements in the parish. Other villages include:

Bagatelle
Bellevue Chopin (also in St. George)
Boetica
Bordeaux
Delices
Dubuc
Fond St. Jean
Geneva
Hagley
Montine
Petite Savanne
Pichelin
Pointe Caribe
Ravine Banane
Stowe
Tete Morne
La Plaine

References

External links

 
Parishes of Dominica